Camille Muzinga (born 6 December 1980) is a Congolese former football player.

Club career
Muzinga played several seasons in the Belgian First Division with Lokeren.

International career
He was part of the Congolese 2004 African Nations Cup team, who finished bottom of their group in the first round of competition, thus failing to secure qualification for the quarter-finals.

Honours
Rapid Bucuresti
Liga I: 2002–03

References

External links

Profile & stats - Lokeren

1980 births
Living people
Democratic Republic of the Congo footballers
Democratic Republic of the Congo international footballers
2004 African Cup of Nations players
K.S.C. Lokeren Oost-Vlaanderen players
F.C. Ashdod players
FC Rapid București players
Al-Khor SC players
Expatriate footballers in Belgium
Expatriate footballers in Israel
Belgian Pro League players
Liga I players
Israeli Premier League players
Democratic Republic of the Congo expatriate footballers
Expatriate footballers in Romania
Democratic Republic of the Congo expatriate sportspeople in Romania
Association football midfielders
Qatar Stars League players
K. Sint-Niklase S.K.E. players
21st-century Democratic Republic of the Congo people